The Red Line (formerly the 42S South Hills Village via Beechview) is a line on the Pittsburgh Light Rail system that runs between South Hills Village and Downtown Pittsburgh via the Beechview neighborhood. The companion route, the Blue Line, branches off north of Martin Villa – which closed in 2012 – and runs through Overbrook. In March 2007, the closure of the Palm Garden Bridge for refurbishment suspended the Red Line for five months; it resumed service in September.

Route 

The line begins at South Hills Village in Upper St. Clair, and runs north to Washington Junction through Bethel Park, providing a transfer to the Blue Line - Library, which runs via Overbrook. The Red Line continues north through Castle Shannon and Mount Lebanon, then through the Mount Lebanon Rail Tunnel underneath Washington Road/West Liberty Avenue (aka Truck U.S. Route 19) into Dormont at the other end.  The first station coming out of the tunnel northbound is Dormont Junction, then line proceeds through this suburb, crossing many streets via grade crossings. The line then arrives at Potomac, where it begins travelling through street trackage about a quarter mile down the tracks, crossing into the neighborhood of Beechview in the city of Pittsburgh near the former Neeld Avenue stop.

Before the Mt. Lebanon Rail Tunnel, the old streetcars ran with car traffic on Washington Road between Alfred Street in Mt. Lebanon and the intersection of McFarland Road and Raleigh Avenue (where Washington Road becomes West Liberty Avenue) in Dormont.

At South Hills Junction the Red Line rejoins the Blue Line and the Brown Line, which runs over Mount Washington through the Allentown neighborhood. The Red Line runs through the Mount Washington Transit Tunnel, stopping at Station Square before crossing the Monongahela River on the Panhandle Bridge. Reaching downtown at First Avenue, the Red Line proceeds underground to Steel Plaza, Wood Street and Gateway Center. Upon reaching Gateway, the route then proceeds under the Allegheny River and makes additional stops at North Side and Allegheny stations on the North Shore.

Pittsburgh Regional Transit closed seven stations along the Red Line on June 25, 2012: Santa Barbara, Martin Villa, Kelton, Neeld, Boustead, Coast and Traymore. An additional station, Pennant, was closed on February 15, 2021, due to safety concerns. The line was renamed slightly to Red Line - Castle Shannon via Beechview when the North Shore Connector opened.

Stations
The Pittsburgh Light Rail has three types of stations. They are low platform, high platform, and underground. High platform and underground stations are wheelchair accessible as the train doors are level with the platform. Low platform stations are not wheelchair accessible as they require passengers to climb stairs to board the light rail vehicle.

References

External links 

 Red Line schedule

Light rail in Pennsylvania
Electric railways in Pennsylvania
Port Authority of Allegheny County
Underground rapid transit in the United States
5 ft 2½ in gauge railways in the United States
Streetcars in Pennsylvania
Passenger rail transportation in Pennsylvania
Transportation in Pittsburgh
650 V DC railway electrification